正子 may refer to:
Jeong-ja, Korean feminine given name
Masako, Japanese feminine given name
Seiko (given name), Japanese feminine given name